Prince Lotor, known as  in the original Japanese language Beast King GoLion and in the sixth season of Voltron: Legendary Defender, is a fictional character in the media franchise Voltron, and is an antagonist of the Voltron Force who made his first appearance in Voltron.

Voltron: Defender of the Universe

"Yurak Gets His Pink Slip" (1984) was Prince Lotor's first appearance, as the initial primary antagonist to the Voltron Force.

Voltron: The Third Dimension

In the final battle with the Voltron Force, Lotor was seriously injured when Voltron destroyed his space ship. Though he was recovered, in order to save his life, Galaxy Alliance doctors rebuilt Lotor using metal limbs. Lotor was imprisoned under maximum security conditions at the prison facility Bastille 12. He escaped and sought revenge on the Voltron Force.

Voltron Force

Prince Lotor  was killed by Voltron several years before the start of the show, Lotor was brought back to life by Maahox, using the power of Haggarium.  He assumes the throne of Planet Doom. With Maahox as his personal advisor, he collects Haggarium and launches several attacks against Arus and Voltron for the purpose of getting information. He fights Voltron by himself, until Voltron in its Red Center transformation kills him.

Voltron: Legendary Defender

Prince Lotor is the prince of the Galra Empire and the son of Emperor Zarkon. After Zarkon's defeat to Voltron puts the emperor in a coma, under the care of Haggar, the prince is summoned by the witch to lead in his father's stead. Lotor, with mysterious plans of his own, would join with the Voltron Force after Zarkon awakens and declares his son an enemy of the Empire. The prince eventually kills his own father and takes the throne.

This alliance soon sours as Lotor's true motives are revealed and he battles Voltron with his own superpowered robot, Sincline. Lotor is ultimately defeated and abandoned to die in the Quintessence comprising the barrier between realities. While Sincline is later retrieved by Haggar, Lotor's own fate is left ambiguous. A younger Lotor from an alternate timeline is briefly seen in the eighth season, failing to recognize Haggar as Honerva.

Comics

In the 2011 Devil's Due comics, the Prince Lotor character appears in the book.

Conception
One the differences to Prince Lotor in Voltron: Legendary Defender compared to his 1984 counterpart is that he didn't have an obsessive love towards Princess Allura. His affection for her is treated as genuine, which is confirmed by series staff writers.

According to the Voltron writer Lauren Montgomery, the reason why Lotor became evil was his tragic upbringing where he was abandoned by his parents (his mother not knowing he was her son), Lotor had to survive on his own, even if it means tricking others to get what he wanted. Montgomery further stated that had Lotor raised by in a better background, Lotor would likely have grown into a much better person.

Prince Lotor's life is multiplied by Quintessence, allowing him to live for 10,000 years, due to being already conceived by the time his mother, Honerva, entered the rift on Daibazaal.

Reception
The character has been praised for being a nuanced character.

See also

References

Television characters introduced in 1984
Voltron
Male characters in animation
Villains in animated television series
Extraterrestrial supervillains
Fictional characters who use magic
Fictional commanders
Fictional humanoids
Fictional princes
Fictional warlords